Lóránd Pászka (born 22 March 1996) is a Hungarian football player who currently plays for Ferencvárosi TC.

Career
A youth product of Szeged, Pászka began his career with the club in 2013. He had a stint with Gyula in 2015, before returning to Szeged that same year. In 2019 he transferred to Soroksár, where he scored 5 goals in 73 league appearances.

On 14 February 2022, he transferred to Ferencváros. In his debut season with Ferencváros he won the Nemzeti Bajnokság I and Magyar Kupa.

Personal life
Born in Romania, Pászka is of Hungarian descent.

Honours
Ferencváros
 Nemzeti Bajnokság I: 2021–22
 Magyar Kupa: 2021–22

References 

1996 births
Living people
People from Târgu Secuiesc
Romanian footballers
Hungarian footballers
Romanian people of Hungarian descent
Nemzeti Bajnokság I players
Nemzeti Bajnokság II players
Nemzeti Bajnokság III players
Gyulai Termál FC players
Soroksár SC players
Ferencvárosi TC footballers